The River Greta is a river in County Durham, England. It is a tributary of the River Tees and flows through the northern part of the old North Riding of Yorkshire. The name "Greta" derives from the Old Norse "Griótá", meaning "stony stream".

The river rises in the Pennines and drains Spittal Ings, Roper Castle (or Round Table) and Beldoo Moss to the east of Moudy Mea, before running east through Stainmore Forest. It is joined at West Charity Farm by Sleightholme Beck, its main tributary, which runs north-east from its source between Bog Moss and Sleightholme Moor where it is formed by the confluence of Dry Gill and Frumming Beck. From there, the river travels through Bowes, where, close to the site of the Roman fort of Lavatris it is crossed by the Pennine Way.

The area through which the Greta flows was a favourite haunt of artists, notably John Sell Cotman and J. M. W. Turner. There are also many historic sites adjacent to the river including cup and ring carvings on Barningham Moor, an early Norman Keep at Scargill, the site of a Roman shrine on Scargill Moor (now in the Bowes Museum and the 17thC watermill - Brignall Mill (now a holiday cottage).

Settlements (from source)
 Spital
 Bowes
 Gilmondby
 Scargill
 Barningham
 Greta Bridge

Tributaries (from source)
 Ay Gill
 Red Gill
 Burnt Gill
 Sleightholme Beck
 Dry Gill
 White Stone Gill
 Polly Gutter
 Ease Gill
 Rea Gill
 Great Wygill
 Back Gutter
 Frumming Beck
 Hug Gill
 Eller Beck
 Thwaite Beck
 Seavy Sike
 Gregory Beck
 Gill Beck
 Stang Gill
 Woodclose Gill
 Tutta Beck

References

 *  

Greta